Villetelle is a commune in the Hérault department in the Occitanie region in southern France.

Geography

The river Vidourle crosses the commune.

History

The Gallo-Roman archaeological site of Ambrussum is located there.

Education

Administration

Population

Pictures

See also
 Pont Ambroix
Communes of the Hérault department

References

External links

 Official Web site
 Tourist office Web site
 Ambrussum Web site

Communes of Hérault